Sloanea berteroana is a tree of the Caribbean region.  The name is often misspelled as Sloanea berteriana. Its vernacular names include montillo and bullwood.  It is native to Puerto Rico.  This tree is common in the Toro Negro State Forest.

Notes

References

berteroana
Trees of the Caribbean
Flora of Puerto Rico
Flora without expected TNC conservation status